Bishop of Leeds may refer to:
The Anglican Bishop of Leeds (the ordinary of the Church of England Diocese of Leeds)
The Roman Catholic Bishop of Leeds (the ordinary of the Roman Catholic Diocese of Leeds)